Volleyball at the 2016 Summer Paralympics was held from 9 September to 18 September at the Riocentro Pavilion 6 in Rio de Janeiro. Two sitting volleyball team events were held, one for men and one for women.

In the men's sitting event, Bosnia and Herzegovina are the defending champions. Bosnia and Herzegovina and Iran were the finalists in 2000, 2004, 2008 and 2012, with Iran winning in 2000 and 2008 and Bosnia and Herzegovina in 2004 and 2012.

The Rio Games will be the fourth time the women's sitting volleyball event will be contested. China are the defending champions, defeating the United States for gold in 2012. Ukraine won bronze in 2012, their first ever medal in the event.

This was the fourth Summer Paralympic Games without standing volleyball events, which had been included from the introduction of volleyball in 1976 (when sitting volleyball was a demonstration event) through 2000.

Classification
In sitting volleyball there are two categories of classification: disabled and minimal disability.  A maximum of one minimally disabled player may be on the court for each team at any one time.

A part of the player's body between the buttocks and the shoulders must be in contact with the court when playing or attempting to play the ball.

Qualification
There will be 16 teams, 8 men's teams and 8 women's teams, taking part. Each country can enter one team per tournament.

Men's Qualification

Women's Qualification

Men's competition

The competition consisted of two stages; a preliminary round followed by a knockout stage.

Preliminary round
The teams were divided into two groups of four countries, playing every team in their group once. Two points were awarded for win, one point for a loss. The top four teams per group qualified for the quarter-finals.

Group A

Group B

Knock-out stage

Women's competition

The competition consisted of two stages; a preliminary round followed by a knockout stage.

Preliminary round
The teams were divided into two groups of four countries, playing every team in their group once. Two points were awarded for win, one point for a loss. The top four teams per group qualified for the quarter-finals.

Group A

Group B

Knock-out stage

Medalists

References

 
2016
2016 Summer Paralympics events
Paralympics
International volleyball competitions hosted by Brazil